Alkalibacillus filiformis is a Gram-positive, haloalkaliphilic and non-motile bacterium from the genus of Alkalibacillus which has been isolated from water and mud from Malvizza, Montecalvo Irpino, Italy.

References

 

Bacillaceae
Bacteria described in 2005